Elections to  took place on 5 May 2022 on the same day as the 31 other Scottish local government elections. The election will be the first to use the nine wards created under the Islands (Scotland) Act 2018 which allowed for single and dual member wards, with 29 councillors being elected. Each ward elected either 2, 3 or 4 members, using the Single Transferrable Vote electoral system, a form of proportional representation. Following a boundary review the number of wards will increase from nine to 11 while the number of councillors elected will fall from 31 to 29.

In the previous election in 2017, independent councillors retained a large majority of the seats on the council and retained control of the administration. The first two female councillors were elected since 2012.

Background

Composition
Since the previous election, there has been a single change in council composition, with SNP Cllr Calum MacMillan joining the Alba Party. A single by-election was held and resulted in an independent hold.

Retiring councillors

Boundary changes
Following the implementation of the Islands (Scotland) Act 2018, a review of the boundaries was undertaken in North Ayrshire, Argyll and Bute, Highland, Orkney Islands, Shetland Islands and Comhairle nan Eilean Siar. The act allowed for single- or two-member wards to be created to allow for better representation of island communities. As a result, the number wards was increased from nine to 11 but the number of councillors was reduced from 31 to 29. The An Taobh Siar agus Nis ward was the only ward to remain with the same boundaries but the number of councillors was reduced from four to three. There were changes to the boundaries for the Loch a Tuath, Sgìre an Rubha, Steòrnabhagh a Tuath and Steòrnabhagh a Deas wards but the number of councillors remained the same for each except Sgìre an Rubha which was reduced to two seats. New dual-member wards were created for Barraigh agus Bhatarsaigh, Na Hearadh, Sgìr' Ùige agus Carlabhagh, Sgìre nan Loch and Uibhist a Tuath.

Controversy
After nominations closed on 30 March 2022, two wards – Barraigh agus Bhatarsaigh and Sgìr' Ùige agus Carlabhagh – received less candidates than seats available. Both are dual member wards and only one person stood for election in each. As a result, both candidates – along with the two candidates who stood for election in the dual-member Sgìre an Rubha ward – will be automatically elected without a poll being conducted. The lack of interest in standing for election was called a "threat to local democracy" by the Greens. Across Scotland, 18 councillors will be automatically elected because the number of candidates was not enough to trigger an election. During the 2017 local elections in Scotland, just three council wards were uncontested but votes were held in every ward in both 2007 and 2012 – the first elections to use multi-member wards and the Single transferable vote. By-elections will be organised in Barraigh agus Bhatarsaigh and Sgìr' Ùige agus Carlabhagh to elect a second councillor. Public disinterest in standing for election to local councils has been linked to the "ridiculous" size of some local authorities and the low pay councillors receive for their work.

Results

Note: "Votes" are the first preference votes. The net gain/loss and percentage changes compare with the previous Scottish local elections. These figures may differ from other published sources showing gains/losses in comparison with the seats held at the dissolution of the council in 2022.

Ward summary

|- class="unsortable" align="centre"
!rowspan=2 align="left"|Ward
! % 
!Cllrs
! %
!Cllrs
! %
!Cllrs
! %
!Cllrs
! %
!Cllrs
!rowspan=2|TotalCllrs
|- class="unsortable" align="center"
!colspan=2 bgcolor=""|Independents
!colspan=2 bgcolor=""|SNP
!colspan=2 bgcolor=""|Conservative
!colspan=2 bgcolor=""|Green
!colspan=2 bgcolor=""|Alba
|-
|align="left"|Barraigh agus Bhatarsaigh
|
|1
|colspan=8 align="center" 
|1
|-
|align="left"|Uibhist a Deas, Èirisgeigh agus Beinn na Faoghla
|bgcolor="" |62.6
|bgcolor="" |2
|16.9
|1
|colspan=2 
|13.5
|0
|7.0
|0
|3
|-
|align="left"|Uibhist a Tuath
|
|
|
|
|
|
|
|
|
|
|2
|-
|align="left"|Na Hearadh
|
|
|
|
|
|
|
|
|
|
|2
|-
|align="left"|Sgìre nan Loch
|
|
|
|
|
|
|
|
|
|
|2
|-
|align="left"|Sgìr' Ùige agus Carlabhagh
|colspan=5 align="center" 
|1
|colspan=4 
|1
|-
|align="left"|An Taobh Siar agus Nis
|
|
|
|
|
|
|
|
|
|
|3
|-
|align="left"|Loch a Tuath
|
|
|
|
|
|
|
|
|
|
|3
|-
|align="left"|Steòrnabhagh a Tuath
|
|
|
|
|
|
|
|
|
|
|4
|-
|align="left"|Steòrnabhagh a Deas
|
|
|
|
|
|
|
|
|
|
|4
|-
|align="left"|Sgìre an Rubha
|
|2
|colspan=8 align="center" 
|2
|- class="unsortable" class="sortbottom"
!align="left"| Total
!
!20
!
!6
!
!1
!
!0
!
!0
!27
|}

Notes

Ward results

Barraigh agus Bhatarsaigh

Uibhist a Deas, Èirisgeigh agus Beinn na Faoghla

Uibhist a Tuath

Na Hearadh

Sgìre nan Loch

Sgìr' Ùige agus Carlabhagh

An Taobh Siar agus Nis

Loch a Tuath

Steòrnabhagh a Tuath

Steòrnabhagh a Deas

Sgìre an Rubha

Aftermath
By-elections were called shortly after the election in Barraigh agus Bhatarsaigh (Ward 1) and Sgìr' Ùige agus Carlabhagh (Ward 6). This was due to the lack of nominations received for the wards at the full election of the council. The by-elections were held on 30 June 2022.

Notes

References

External links
 Council website

2022
Comhairle nan Eilean Siar